Behrakis is a surname. Notable people with the surname include:

 George D. Behrakis (born 1934), Greek-American entrepreneur and philanthropist
 Yannis Behrakis (1960–2019), Greek photojournalist

Greek-language surnames